Nicolas Gavory (born 16 February 1995) is a French professional footballer who plays as a left-back for 2. Bundesliga club Fortuna Düsseldorf. He is a France youth international having represented his nation at under-16, under-17 and under-19 level.

Career
On 22 September 2012, Gavory made his professional debut with Auxerre appearing as a substitute in a 4–3 defeat in the Ligue 2 to Guingamp.

In May 2017 it was announced Gavory would join Ligue 2 club Clermont from Championnat National side Béziers for the 2017–18 season.

In August 2018, he joined Eredivisie side FC Utrecht from Clermont on a three-year contract with the option of a fourth year.

In June 2019, he joined Belgian club Standard Liège.

Gavory moved to 2. Bundesliga club Fortuna Düsseldorf in January 2022, having agreed a contract until summer 2025.

References

External links
 
 
 
 
 

Living people
1995 births
Sportspeople from Beauvais
French footballers
Association football fullbacks
France youth international footballers
AJ Auxerre players
AS Béziers (2007) players
Clermont Foot players
FC Utrecht players
Standard Liège players
Fortuna Düsseldorf players
Ligue 2 players
Championnat National players
Eredivisie players
Belgian Pro League players
2. Bundesliga players
French expatriate footballers
French expatriate sportspeople in the Netherlands
Expatriate footballers in the Netherlands
French expatriate sportspeople in Belgium
Expatriate footballers in Belgium
French expatriate sportspeople in Germany
Expatriate footballers in Germany
Footballers from Hauts-de-France